Artur Gabrielian (born 26 December 1982) is an Armenian Russian chess player who plays for the Chess Federation of Russia. Since 2009, he holds the title Grandmaster.

Biography
Artur Gabrielian was born in the Azerbaijani capital of Baku during Soviet times, but his family moved to the city of Hrazdan in Armenia a year and a half later. There, under the guidance of child trainer Arnold Hakobjanyan, Gabrielian began to play chess at the age of 8.

In 1994 his family moved to the city of Georgiyevsk in Russia. There, he repeatedly won the Stavropol Krai championship. Gabrielian later studied at the Russian State University of Sport in Moscow. In 2002 he reached the final of the Moscow championship, but lost to Vladimir Malakhov. In the same year he received the title of International Master. In 2004, Gabrielian reached the final of the internet competition Dos Hermanos, and in 2008 he came in third at the Moscow championship. In 2009 he won the Rector's Prize BelGU and in the same year he achieved the title of Grandmaster.

After graduating, Gabrielian returned to Georgiyevsk and repeatedly won the championship of South Russia and the North Caucasus. He competed in the major leagues of the Russian Championships and the country's team championships, as well as the 2010 Pan-Armenian Games. He qualified for the 2012 Russian Cup final.

Gabrielian also works as a chess coach. His students include GM , IM , WIM , FM  and Anna Ulanovskaya. He lives in Rostov-on-Don.

Together with 43 other Russian chess players, Gabrielian signed an open letter to President of Russia Vladimir Putin, calling on him to immediately stop the 2022 Russian invasion of Ukraine and to find a peaceful solution to the conflict.

FIDE ratings

Notes

References

External links

 
 
 
 

1982 births
Living people
Chess grandmasters
Russian chess players
Russian sportspeople of Armenian descent
Chess players from Baku
Soviet Armenians